Earl Otto Johansson (June 28, 1931 – February 7, 2015), better known as "Ching" Johnson, was a Canadian ice hockey player. He played one regular season game in the National Hockey League with the Detroit Red Wings during the 1953–54 season, on March 20, 1954 against the Montreal Canadiens. The rest of his career, which lasted from 1949 to 1965, was spent in various minor leagues.

Personal life
He was the father of actor Paul Johansson, who plays Dan Scott in American TV show One Tree Hill, and comedian Pete Johansson. A devout Catholic, Earl was known for his religious conviction and dedication to prayer. His home church was Immaculate Conception in Kelowna.

Career statistics

Regular season and playoffs

See also
 List of players who played only one game in the NHL

References

Total Hockey 2nd Edition, Dan Diamond; Scarborough, Ontario. Page 734.

External links
 

1931 births
2015 deaths
Canadian ice hockey left wingers
Canadian Roman Catholics
Detroit Hettche players
Detroit Red Wings players
Edmonton Flyers (WHL) players
Ice hockey people from Ontario
Los Angeles Blades (WHL) players
New Haven Blades players
Pittsburgh Hornets players
Providence Reds players
Quebec Aces (QSHL) players
Sherbrooke Saints players
Spokane Comets players
Spokane Jets players
Sportspeople from Fort Frances
Springfield Indians players
Stanley Cup champions
Trois-Rivières Lions (1955–1960) players
Vancouver Canucks (WHL) players
Windsor Spitfires players